Spencer Davis Lanning (born May 21, 1988) is an American football former punter who played 3 years in the NFL, almost exclusively with the Cleveland Browns. He was signed by the Chicago Bears as an undrafted free agent in 2011. He played college football for the University of South Carolina Gamecocks.

College career 
Lanning finished his collegiate career with the South Carolina Gamecocks with 171 punts for a 42.6-yard average and 46 punts inside the 20-yard line. He also played kicker during his final two collegiate seasons, connecting on 34 of 44 field goal attempts and 80 of 84 extra points.

Professional career

Chicago Bears
Lanning was originally signed by the Chicago Bears as an undrafted free agent in 2011.

Jacksonville Jaguars
Lanning was signed by the Jacksonville Jaguars as a free agent on January 4, 2012, and later released by the team on April 28.

New York Jets
Lanning was claimed off waivers by the New York Jets on August 28, 2012. He was waived by the Jets on August 31, 2012.

Sacramento Mountain Lions
In 2012, he signed with the Sacramento Mountain Lions of the United Football League.

Cleveland Browns

 

Lanning was signed by the Cleveland Browns on May 2, 2012.
Lanning was re-signed as a free agent by the Browns February 13, 2013. On September 22, 2013, in a 31–27 win over the Minnesota Vikings, Lanning recorded a touchdown pass, punt, and an extra point. He became the first player to accomplish such a feat since Sam Baker in 1968. Lanning garnered media attention following a game against the Pittsburgh Steelers on September 7, 2014. When Lanning attempted to tackle Steelers punt returner Antonio Brown, Brown "attempted" to hurdle the punter and kicked Lanning in the face. Brown was flagged for unnecessary roughness on the play and received an $8,200 fine.

Lanning was released on June 6, 2015, when the Browns traded for longtime San Francisco 49ers punter Andy Lee.

Tampa Bay Buccaneers
Lanning was claimed off waivers by the Tampa Bay Buccaneers on June 9, 2015. He was later released by the team on August 13, 2015.

Denver Broncos
The Denver Broncos claimed Lanning off waivers on August 14, 2015. He was released by the team on August 31, 2015.

Chicago Bears (second stint)
The Chicago Bears signed Lanning on October 3, 2015, to punt for Week 4 in place of the injured Pat O'Donnell. He was released by the team on October 6. In his lone game with the Bears, Lanning punted three times for 156 yards with a net average of 35.7.

Personal life 
On November 11, 2014, Lanning became engaged to Brittany Jasenski.

References

External links
 Jacksonville Jaguars bio
 Cleveland Browns bio

1988 births
Living people
People from Rock Hill, South Carolina
Players of American football from South Carolina
American football punters
South Carolina Gamecocks football players
Chicago Bears players
Jacksonville Jaguars players
Cleveland Browns players
New York Jets players
Sacramento Mountain Lions players
Tampa Bay Buccaneers players
Denver Broncos players